Henry Meredyth (1675 – 12 December 1715) was an Irish politician. 

Meredyth was the son of Charles Meredyth and his first wife, Anne Blayney. 

He represented Kells in the Irish House of Commons between 1710 and 1713, being elected to replace his late father. He subsequently sat for the Navan constituency from 1713 to 1714.

He married Mary Butler 24 Oct 1702.

References

1675 births
1715 deaths
18th-century Anglo-Irish people
Irish MPs 1703–1713
Irish MPs 1713–1714
Members of the Parliament of Ireland (pre-1801) for County Meath constituencies
Henry